"20 Golden Greats" is a compilation album by Diana Ross, released on the Motown label in Europe in 1979. Although Ross had scored 22 single hits in the UK since leaving The Supremes in 1970, the album only contained the 18 solo tracks that had charted for Ross in the UK, together with the two tracks that had charted in partnership with Marvin Gaye. Both the hit singles Ease on Down (with Michael Jackson) and Pops, We Love You (with Marvin Gaye, Smokey Robinson and Stevie Wonder) were excluded in favour of solo hits. By the time the album was released, Ross had already scored her 23rd post-Supremes hit single (her 19th solo) with It's My House, which was thus not included. The album was released just two years after the 20 Golden Greats compilation featuring 18 of her 21 UK hits with The Supremes. The album was certified Platinum in the U.K for sales in excess of 300,000 copies. As of February 1980, the album has sold 990,000 units in the UK alone.

The album was released for the international market and became the singer's best charting album in the UK since another greatest hits collection (released in 1976) also peaked at #2. Due to the large number of tracks included and the time limitations of the vinyl album format the running time of several titles were changed and were either slightly edited or had fade-out ends. The 20 Golden Greats album remains unreleased on CD.

Track listing

Charts

Certifications

References

1979 greatest hits albums
Tamla Records compilation albums
Diana Ross compilation albums